Rich & Famous is an EP by German heavy metal band Accept, released in 2002.

Track listing

Credits
Udo Dirkschneider – vocals
Wolf Hoffmann – guitar
Jörg Fischer – guitar on "Breaker"
Peter Baltes – bass guitar
Stefan Kaufmann – drums

Accept (band) albums
2002 EPs